The Truth is the second studio album by American girl group Cherish. It was released on May 13, 2008, and was met with mixed to positive reviews from critics. The album spawned two singles, "Killa" and "Amnesia," and reached number 40 on the Billboard 200.

Writing and recording
The group began writing and recording the album about eighteen months after their debut; they wrote (or co-wrote) all but one song on the album by themselves. In an interview with Blues & Soul magazine, group member Fallon King commented that the group had matured since the recording of their debut, and that the recording process was much easier for the follow-up record because the producers were already familiar with the group's style. She added that "with this new album, we definitely wanted everyone to know we are songwriters and our music does reflect our own personal lives."

Critical reception
The album elicited generally mixed to favorable reviews from critics. AllMusic's Matthew Chisling awarded the album 3 out of 5 stars and commented that, while the album was more distinctive than its predecessor, "the slow tracks pile up, and the disc is thick on serious subjects and heartbreak and anger, which kills much of the momentum." He felt that the album bore strong resemblances to Destiny's Child, and concluded that the album is "a terrific, outdated R&B album." Soul Tracks' Melody Charles felt that, while the dancefloor-ready songs were the album's highlights, the ballads showcased the group's maturity and that "one can't help but enjoy" them. DJBooth.net's Nathan S. commented that the group members "are perfectly decent singers, but they just can’t stand next to the Beyonce’s of the world," adding that "while The Truth doesn’t address the essence of life on a deeply philosophical level, Cherish does reveal the inner-workings of their own hearts and minds (which apparently consist almost entirely of clothes and boys)" and concluding that "how you feel about Cherish’s brand of r&b depends largely on if their truth is also yours."

Singles
The album spawned two singles. The first, "Killa," was a success in the US and the UK. In the US, the song gave the group their second top 40 on the Billboard Hot 100, where it peaked at number 39. The song was also a hit in the UK, where it peaked at number 52 and gave them their second British top 75 hit. In Canada, "Killa" was also a modest success, where it reached number 94; it remains their only entry on the Canadian Hot 100. The album's second single, "Amnesia," was far less successful, failing to chart in Canada or the UK and peaking at number 61 on the US Billboard Hot R&B/Hip-Hop Songs chart.

Commercial performance
The Truth was far less successful than Unappreciated. In its first week, the album sold 13,000 copies in the US and debuted at number 40 on the Billboard 200. The album also debuted and peaked at number 6 on the R&B/Hip-Hop Albums chart, giving the group their second top 10 entry on that chart. In its second week, The Truth fell out of the top 100 on the Billboard 200, falling to number 109. The album spent a total of 5 weeks on the Billboard 200 before falling off.  As of 2009, the album has only sold 80,000 copies in the U.S.

Track listing

Charts

References

2008 albums
Cherish (group) albums
Capitol Records albums
Albums produced by Bryan-Michael Cox
Albums produced by Eric Hudson
Albums produced by Jazze Pha
Albums produced by Theron Feemster
Albums produced by Tricky Stewart